Mount Elbrus is the highest mountain in Russia and Europe.

Elbrus may also refer to:

People
 Elbrus Tandelov (born 1982), Russian footballer
 Elbrus Tedeyev (born 1974), Ossetian-Ukrainian wrestler
 Elbrus Zurayev (born 1982), Russian footballer

Other
 Elbrus (computer), a line of Soviet and Russian computer systems
 Elbrus-Avia, a Russian airline, 1998–2009
 R-17 Elbrus, a Soviet-designed tactical ballistic missile
 160013 Elbrus, asteroid

See also
 
 Alborz (disambiguation)